Nikolayev/Nikolaev (masculine) or Nikolayeva/Nikolaevа (feminine) may refer to:

Nikolayev (surname) (includes Nikolayeva)
Nikolayev/Nikolaev, Russian spellings of Mykolaiv (disambiguation), several places in Ukraine
Nikolayev (crater), a Moon crater

See also
Mykolaiv, a city in Ukraine also known as Nikolayev
Nikolaevo, a town in Stara Zagora Province, Bulgaria
Nikolayevka (disambiguation)
Nikolayevsk (disambiguation)
Nikolayevsky (disambiguation)